Coleophora pannosa is a moth of the family Coleophoridae.

References

pannosa
Moths described in 1992